Niedrzaków  is a village in the administrative district of Gmina Strzelce, within Kutno County, Łódź Voivodeship, in central Poland.

Owners 
During the 17th Century the village belonged to the royal land, but was given to some nobilities. 

Aleksander Petrykowski
Hieronim Petrykowski (until 1683)
Jerzy and Zofia Bojemski

References

Villages in Kutno County